Quántáng (泉塘) may refer to:

 Quantang, Wuwei County, town in Anhui, China
 Quantang, Xiangxiang, town in Hunan, China